Alan Charles Hunt  (born 5 March 1941) is a former British diplomat.

He was educated at Latymer Upper School and at the University of East Anglia, where he obtained a first class degree in European studies. He was Counsellor and then Charge d’Affaires in Argentina between 1987 and 1990, during a period in which diplomatic relations between the two countries were severed following the Falklands War. He served as British High Commissioner to Singapore from 1997 to 2001.  He was appointed a Companion of St Michael and St George (CMG) in 1990.

Honours
  Companion of the Order of St Michael and St George (CMG) - 1990

References

1941 births
Living people
People educated at Latymer Upper School
Alumni of the University of East Anglia
Companions of the Order of St Michael and St George
High Commissioners of the United Kingdom to Singapore